In mathematics, especially in linear algebra and matrix theory, a centrosymmetric matrix is a matrix which is symmetric about its center. More precisely, an n×n matrix A = [Ai,j] is centrosymmetric when its entries satisfy

Ai,j = An−i + 1,n−j + 1 for i, j ∊{1, ..., n}.

If J denotes the n×n exchange matrix with 1 on the antidiagonal and 0 elsewhere (that is, Ji,n + 1 − i = 1; Ji,j = 0 if j ≠ n +1− i), then a matrix A is centrosymmetric if and only if AJ = JA.

Examples

 All 2×2 centrosymmetric matrices have the form 
 All 3×3 centrosymmetric matrices have the form 
 Symmetric Toeplitz matrices are centrosymmetric.

Algebraic structure and properties
If A and B are centrosymmetric matrices over a field F, then so are A + B and cA for any c in F. Moreover, the matrix product AB is centrosymmetric, since JAB = AJB = ABJ. Since the identity matrix is also centrosymmetric, it follows that the set of n×n centrosymmetric matrices over F is a subalgebra of the associative algebra of all n×n matrices.
If A is a centrosymmetric matrix with an m-dimensional eigenbasis, then its m eigenvectors can each be chosen so that they satisfy either x = Jx or x = −Jx where J is the exchange matrix.
If A is a centrosymmetric matrix with distinct eigenvalues, then the matrices that commute with A must be centrosymmetric.

Related structures
An n×n matrix A is said to be skew-centrosymmetric if its entries satisfy Ai,j = −An−i+1,n−j+1 for i, j ∊ {1, ..., n}. Equivalently, A is skew-centrosymmetric if AJ = −JA, where J is the exchange matrix defined above.

The centrosymmetric relation AJ = JA lends itself to a natural generalization, where J is replaced with an involutory matrix K (i.e., K2 = I) or, more generally, a matrix K satisfying Km = I for an integer m > 1.  The inverse problem for the commutation relation  of identifying all involutory K that commute with a fixed matrix A has also been studied.

Symmetric centrosymmetric matrices are sometimes called bisymmetric matrices.  When the ground field is the field of real numbers, it has been shown that bisymmetric matrices are precisely those symmetric matrices whose eigenvalues remain the same aside from possible sign changes following pre- or post-multiplication by the exchange matrix.  A similar result holds for Hermitian centrosymmetric and skew-centrosymmetric matrices.

References

Further reading

External links
 Centrosymmetric matrix on MathWorld.

Linear algebra
Matrices